Hylettus magnus is a species of longhorn beetles of the subfamily Lamiinae. It was described by Monné in 1988, and is known from western central Brazil.

References

Beetles described in 1988
Endemic fauna of Brazil
Hylettus